Nazak Afshar is a French-Iranian woman currently imprisoned in Iran. Iranian authorities arrested Afshar in March 2016 upon her arrival in the country to visit her critically ill mother. Afshar, who formerly worked at the French embassy in Tehran, "had previously been arrested in 2009 on charges of spying and of acting against Iran's national security." Due to the intervention of the French government at that time, she was freed and left the country that year.

In April 2016, the Iranian judiciary reportedly sentenced her to six years in prison.

See also
 List of foreign nationals detained in Iran
 Clotilde Reiss

References

Living people
Year of birth missing (living people)
Iranian emigrants to France
French people imprisoned in Iran